TITAN Group is a Greek producer of cement and building materials, producing 27 million metric tons of cement a year and employing over 5,500 people.

TITAN is a participant in the UN Global Compact (UNGC) and a core member of CSR Europe the World Business Council for Sustainable Development (WBCSD) and the Global Cement and Concrete Association (GCCA).

The Group’s parent company is TITAN Cement International (TCI), a Belgian company listed on Euronext Brussels, Euronext Paris and Athens Exchange. TITAN Cement International became TITAN Group’s parent company following the successful completion of a Voluntary Share Exchange Offer submitted to the shareholders of TITAN Cement Company S.A., the Group’s former parent company, which is based in Greece. The statutory seat of TCI is in Brussels, while its seat of management is in Cyprus.

Gallery

References

External links

Cement companies of Greece
Manufacturing companies established in 1902
Greek brands
Companies listed on the Athens Exchange
Companies listed on Euronext Brussels
Manufacturing companies based in Athens
Greek companies established in 1902